This is the second book of the In Death series by J. D. Robb, following Naked in Death and preceding Immortal in Death.

Plot 

Eve finds the body of famous Prosecuting Attorney Cicely Towers on the night of May 2. Eve returns to Cop Central to find that Commander Whitney was very good friends with Towers, having started out together when they were very young. Due to this fact, he has personally arranged that Eve be primary. Another victim is found, murdered by the same MO, an actress named Yvonne Metcalf, whose shoe is missing. C. J. Morse is already on the scene, filming the woman's dead body. He snidely informs Eve that Metcalf used to have a relationship with Roarke.

Eve tells Roarke that the killer is stalking famous women. He is unhappy to find that Eve has decided to capitalize on this by becoming bait. Nadine promises to help this by delivering as much media attention as possible, but the scheme doesn't work. Roarke, who has to leave on another business trip, surprises Eve with her own suite of the house, which he has converted (partly with furniture from her apartment) into her own home office, adjoining his.

Eve and Roarke have a night in Mexico; on their return, Eve finds that the lab has tested David's knife as being negative for the murder weapon. The new police chief, Harrison Tibble, tells her to release David and Marcus on lack of evidence. He adds that there is too much emotion involved in this case, lightly censuring both her and Whitney. Afterwards, Eve finds out that Nadine is missing.

During the fight with Morse, Eve miscalculates and gives him the upper hand.   Before he can kill her, Roarke intervenes and saves her, and the knife instead stabs Morse in the throat.  (It is not clear whether or not this was accidental or intentional on Roarke's part.)  Roarke proposes to Eve as they walk away from the scene.

Characters in "Glory in Death"
This book introduces:
 Officer Delia Peabody, eventual aide and partner
 Crack, owner of the Down and Dirty club
 Police Chief Harrison Tibble, boss of Eve's boss Commander Jack Whitney

Publication history
Berkley mass market, 1995, 
Recorded Books (Unabridged), December 1995, 
Nova Audio (Abridged), April 2001, 
Brilliance Audio, April 2001, 
Adobe Reader e-book, Berkley, June 2001, 
e-book, Berkley, June 2001, 
Gemstar e-book, Berkley, January 2002, 
Putnam hardcover, October 2004,

References

In Death (novel series)
1995 American novels